A number of splinter groups have separated from Jehovah's Witnesses since 1931 after members broke affiliation with the Watch Tower Bible and Tract Society of Pennsylvania. Earlier group defections from the Watch Tower Society, most of them between 1917 and 1931, had resulted in a number of religious movements forming under the umbrella term of the Bible Student movement.

After 1931, some isolated groups of Jehovah's Witnesses came to distrust instruction from outside the local area. Some preferred their autonomy even after persecution and isolation abated, such as in Germany following World War II, in Romania following the overthrow of Nicolae Ceaușescu, and in the former USSR following the Cold War. Beginning in the 1990s, other former Witnesses used Internet technologies to group themselves around shared ideas such as numerical analysis of the Bible, or a wish to embrace some but not all of Jehovah's Witness beliefs and practices.

Britain
Jesse Hemery was appointed overseer of the Watch Tower Society's British Isles branch office by Charles Taze Russell in 1901, holding that post until 1946. Hemery founded the Goshen Fellowship after he was disfellowshipped by Nathan H. Knorr in 1951.

Germany, postwar
Scholars estimate that during the Nazi regime, about half of all Jehovah's Witnesses in Germany were incarcerated in prison or concentration camps, where they were exposed to "sadism marked by an unending chain of physical and mental tortures, the likes of which no language in the world can express." At the time, they were represented by several geographical Bible Students Associations, each of which considered itself affiliated with the Watch Tower Society despite little contact with their US headquarters in Brooklyn. When contact was re-established, a minority of German Jehovah's Witnesses either preferred their autonomy or disagreed with the doctrinal changes that had occurred in the meantime. Some disassociated themselves from the Watch Tower Society and some individual members established contact with non-Jehovah's Witness Bible Student groups.

Romania
In 1948, the Romanian government imposed a ban on Jehovah's Witnesses that lasted until 1989. Many Witnesses were arrested and sent to prison or labor camps, and members of the denomination had limited communication with other Witnesses and studied largely from older books and magazines. In 1962, The Watchtower altered its doctrine on the meaning of the phrase "superior authorities" at Romans 13:1, identifying them as human governmental authorities rather than God and Jesus Christ as formerly thought.

Many Witnesses in Romania rejected the change, and some suspected it was a communist fabrication intended to make them subservient to the state. In 1989, after the Romanian ban was lifted, members and representatives of the Governing Body of Jehovah's Witnesses were able to meet thousands of long-separated Romanian Witnesses,. Some Romanians still rejected certain changes and preferred their autonomy, forming The True Faith Association of Jehovah's Witnesses in 1992.

USSR
When the Watch Tower Society changed its interpretation about the "superior authorities", some Jehovah's Witnesses in the USSR suspected that the change came from the KGB instead. This led to formation of the Theocratic Organisation of Jehovah's Witnesses, which discontinued use of Watch Tower Society publications printed after 1962. The group has a presence in Russia, Ukraine, and Moldova, and claims to seek contacts with Witnesses in other countries. The group does not publish any statistics regarding numbers of congregations or adherents, and has little or no public presence.

Internet-era departures 
In 1993, mathematician Gordon Ritchie requested baptism by Jehovah's Witnesses and almost immediately began advocating disagreements with their teachings. He claims he was expelled for apostasy in March 1996. Ritchie contends that Jehovah's Witnesses constituted true religion until 2004, but that his own group of "Lord's Witnesses" is now the sole form of true worship. The group claims several hundred adherents, and argues that their mathematical analysis of the Bible contains divine revelations that Jehovah's Witnesses have ignored.

In 2007, Jehovah's Witness apologist and author Greg G. Stafford, author of Jehovah's Witnesses Defended (Elihu Books), formally disassociated from the group, while insisting on describing himself and his followers as "Jehovah's Witnesses". Stafford has published information about Jehovah's Witnesses, defending many of their distinctive, central beliefs, such as nontrinitarianism. In 2007, Stafford introduced the term "Christian Witnesses of Jah" to describe individuals who believe many of the same things as Jehovah's Witnesses, but who may not embrace the organization or all of its theological teachings.

See also 
 History of Jehovah's Witnesses

References

External links
 Bible Student Ministries
 Chicago Bible Students
 Christian Discipling Ministries International Formerly Christian Millennial Fellowship
 Christian Witnesses of Jah (Greg Stafford)
 Dawn Bible Students Association
 Friends of the Nazarene
 Lords' Witnesses
 Pastor-Russell.com
 Pastoral Bible Institute
 The Bible Standard magazine
 The True Faith Jehovah's Witnesses Association

History of Jehovah's Witnesses
Bible Student movement